The Golden Smile (Danish:Det gyldne smil) is a 1935 Danish drama film directed by Pál Fejös and starring Bodil Ipsen, Helen von Münchofen and John Price. The film's sets were designed by the art director Heinz Fenchel.

Cast 
 Bodil Ipsen as Elsa Bruun
 Helen von Münchofen as Frk. Herjean
 John Price as Forfatter
 Victor Montell as Instruktør
 Petrine Sonne as Fru Sander
 Carl Alstrup as Brandmesteren
 Aage Foss as Portner
 Sam Besekow as Forfatter
 Aage Schmidt as Teaterdirektør
 Carlo Wieth as Peter Clark
 Peter S. Andersen
 Aage Winther-Jørgensen
 Ellen Carstensen Reenberg
 Aage Garde
 Bell Poulsen
 Ruth Berlau as Marie, the housemaid

References

Bibliography 
 Georges Sadoul & Peter Morris. Dictionary of Film Makers. University of California Press, 1972.

External links 
 

1935 films
Danish drama films
1935 drama films
1930s Danish-language films
Films directed by Paul Fejos
Danish black-and-white films